Fish Lake Valley is a ghost town located in the geographic Fish Lake Valley, within Esmeralda County, Nevada and Inyo County, California.

History
Fish Lake Valley was originally settled in 1866, when the 'Palmetto Mining District' in Esmeralda County was formed, and settlement in Fish Lake Valley began. During the 1870s two companies, 'Griffing & Nyman's' and 'Pacific Borax Works' were located here extracting borax at Fish Lake.

The Carson and Columbus Stage Line ran north from Fish Lake Valley to Aurora and Carson City, also connecting with Logsprings, Nevada in the Sylvania Mining District as well as Lida in the Sylvania Mountains. Local ranches supplied food to the freight industry and mining communities such as Fish Lake Valley.

A post office opened in Fish Lake Valley in 1881.

Today a historical marker near the site commemorates the life of W.O. Harrell, known as "Harrell, the Irrepressible, Citizen Extraordinaire", of Fish Lake Valley in the 1870s. A Wm. O. Harrell of Fish Lake Valley is listed as registering a cattle ear mark in 1874.

References

Ghost towns in Nevada
Ghost towns in Esmeralda County, Nevada
Ghost towns in Inyo County, California
Mining communities in California
Mining communities in Nevada
Nevada historical markers
White Mountains (California)
Populated places established in 1866
1866 establishments in California
1866 establishments in Nevada